The Alsen Cross was a military medal of the Kingdom of Prussia. Established 7 December 1864, the medal commemorates the Prussian victory on 29 June 1864 during the Battle of Alsen. The medal was initially awarded with two different suspension ribbons, for combatants and noncombatants. It was subsequently extended to those troops held in reserve at the battle and members of the Johanniter Orden who participated in the battle.

References

External links

Military awards and decorations of Prussia
1864 establishments in Prussia
Awards established in 1864